The indecisive naval battle of Møn was a battle during the Dano-Swedish War (1657–1658). A large number of ships was involved, but the fight was not very intense.

Northern Wars
Møn
Møn
Møn

sv:Slaget vid Møn (1657)